Daniel Andreas Mortensen (born 21 October 1994) is a Danish basketball player for Haukar of the Icelandic Úrvalsdeild karla and the Denmark national team. He played college basketball for Wright State University and Barry University. In 2021, he won the Basketligaen championship with Bakken Bears and in 2022 he was named the Úrvalsdeild Foreign Player of the Year while playing for Þór Þorlákshöfn.

Playing career

Early career
Mortensen started his career with the Hørsholm 79ers in 2013 and played two seasons with the team.

College career
Following his second season with the 79ers, Mortensen joined Wright State University where he played one season with the Wright State Raiders. The following year he transferred to Barry University where he spent the remaining years of his college career.

After college
Following his college career, Mortensen signed with Wetterbygden Stars of the Swedish Basketball League. In 2020, he signed with CB Myrtia of the LEB Oro but shortly later moved to the Bakken Bears where he won the Basketligaen championship in 2021.

In July 2021, Mortensen signed with reigning Icelandic champions Þór Þorlákshöfn. On 18 February, he scored a career high 47 points in a victory against Breiðablik. For the season, he averaged 18.9 points, 8.4 rebounds and 3.1 assists in 29 regular season and playoff games. For his effort, he was named the Úrvalsdeild Foreign Player of the Year.

On 21 May 2022, Mortensen signed with newly promoted Haukar.

References

External links
Icelandic statistics at Icelandic Basketball Association
Barry Buccaneers bio
Profile at Eurobasket.com

1994 births
Living people
Bakken Bears players
Centers (basketball)
Danish expatriate basketball people in Iceland
Danish expatriate basketball people in Spain
Danish expatriate basketball people in Sweden
Danish expatriate basketball people in the United States
Danish men's basketball players
Daniel Mortensen
Hørsholm 79ers players
Daniel Mortensen
Daniel Mortensen